William Alexander Snelling (born 6 August 1997) is an Australian rules footballer who plays for the Essendon Football Club in the Australian Football League (AFL).

He was first drafted by Port Adelaide with their first selection and tenth overall in the 2016 rookie draft. He played his only senior AFL game in Port's twenty-three point win against  in round 23, 2016 at Metricon Stadium. He was delisted by Port Adelaide at the end of the 2018 AFL season.

Essendon career
After being overlooked by all clubs at the 2018 AFL draft, Snelling played for West Adelaide in the South Australian National Football League. He was subsequently selected by Essendon in the 2019 mid-season rookie draft, at pick 7. In round 18 he made his debut for Essendon at Adelaide Oval. He played in the Bombers' next two games against Gold Coast and his former club Port Adelaide before he suffered foot soreness and lost his position in the senior side.

Snelling established himself in Essendon’s best side in 2020, playing every game and finishing ninth in the club Best and Fairest. He signed a one-year contract extension for 2021 at the end of the 2020 season.

References

External links

1997 births
Living people
Port Adelaide Football Club players
Port Adelaide Football Club players (all competitions)
West Adelaide Football Club players
Australian rules footballers from South Australia
Essendon Football Club players